Three Trapped Tigers are a British instrumental experimental rock trio from London, England, composed of keyboardist and vocalist Tom Rogerson, drummer Adam Betts, and guitarist Matt Calvert. Formed in 2007, they have released three EPs and two studio albums to date.

Members
Tom Rogerson – piano, keyboards, vocalist (since 2007)
Adam Betts – drums, electronics (since 2007)
Matt Calvert – guitar, synths, electronics (since 2007)

Discography
Studio albums
Route One or Die (Blood and Biscuits, 2011)
Silent Earthling (Superball, 2016)

Compilations
Numbers: 1-13 (2012)

Extended plays
EP (2008)
EP2 (2009)
EP3 (2010)

Singles
"7/1" (2009)
"Noise Trade" (2011)
"Reset" (2011)

References

Math rock groups
British musical trios
English noise rock groups
Musical groups established in 2007
Superball Music artists